Takanlu-ye Sofla (also known as Takānlū) is a village in Nazarkahrizi Rural District, Nazarkahrizi District, Hashtrud County, East Azerbaijan Province, Iran. At the 2006 census, its population was 172, in 32 families.

References 

Towns and villages in Hashtrud County

تکانلوی سفلی نظر کهریزی با ۵۰ خانوار در ۴.۵ کیلومتری شهر نظر کهریزی و ۴۵ کیلومتری شهرستان هشترود واقع در غرب هشترود میباشد